The House of Demidov also Demidoff, was a prominent Russian noble family during the 18th and 19th centuries. Originating in the city of Tula in the 17th century, the Demidovs found success through metal products, and were entered into the European nobility by Peter the Great. Their descendants became among the most influential merchants and earliest industrialists in the Russian Empire, and at their peak were predicted to be the second-richest family in Russia, behind only the Russian Imperial Family. The Demidov family lost its fortune after the February Revolution of 1917, but continues to exist under the rendering Demidoff.

History

Their progenitor, Demid Antufiev, was a free blacksmith from Tula, where their family necropolis is preserved as a museum. His son Nikita Demidov (March 26, 1656November 17, 1725) made his fortune by his skill in the manufacture of weapons, and established an iron foundry for the government. Peter the Great, with whom he was a favorite, ennobled him in 1720. For two centuries, the Demidov plants produced a large portion of Russia's iron and steel. The Palace of Westminster was one of many notable buildings constructed of Demidov metal products.

Nikita's son, Akinfiy Demidov (1678–1745), increased his inherited wealth by the discovery and working of gold, silver and copper mines. He also founded the Siberian town of Barnaul, whose central square still bears his name. He also commissioned the Leaning Tower of Nevyansk. His fortune was inherited by his eldest son Prokofi Demidov, whilst his younger son Nikita Akinfievitch Demidov (1724–1789) became an arts patron.

Akinfiy's nephew, Pavel Grigoryevich Demidov (1738–1821), was a great traveller and benefactor of Russian scientific education who befriended Carl Linnaeus and Pallas. He established the Demidov Lyceum in Yaroslavl, the Demidov chair in Natural history at Moscow University, and founded an annual prize for Russian literature, awarded by the Academy of Sciences. A bronze monument to him was installed in Yaroslavl in 1828.

Pavel's nephew, Nikolay Nikitich Demidov, fought in the Napoleonic War with distinction, raised and commanded a regiment to oppose Napoleon's invasion of Russia, and carried on the accumulation of the family wealth from mining; he contributed liberally to the erection of four bridges in St Petersburg, and to the propagation of scientific culture in Moscow. He was created a Count by the Grand Duke of Tuscany.

Nikolay's son Count Pavel Nikolayevich Demidov fought as an officer in his father's regiment and received his baptism of fire at the battle of Borodino in 1812. After the war, he entered the Chevalier Guards regiment. He received his discharge in 1831 with the rank of captain when he entered civil service as governor of the province of Kursk. In 1834, he entered service in the Ministry of the Exterior as Imperial Master of the Hunt, later State Councillor. Count Pavel Demidov is best known for his philanthropy, primarily for having founded the Demidov Prize. He married the well-known society beauty and maid-of-honour to Her Majesty the Empress Alexandra Feodorovnya, Aurora Stjernvall in 1836. Their son, Pavel Pavlovich Demidov, who became the 2nd Prince of San Donato, was the grandfather of Prince Paul of Yugoslavia.

Nikolay's second son, Anatoly Nikolaievich Demidov, 1st Prince of San Donato, was a well-known traveller and patron of art. In 1840, he acquired the Italian title of Prince of San Donato and married Princess Mathilde, daughter of Jérôme Bonaparte. His Villa Demidoff is a minor landmark of Florence. Anatole's great grand nephew, Prince Paul of Yugoslavia, was regent of Yugoslavia between 1934 and 1941.

The second and last Prince Lopukhin, Pavel Petrovich Lopukhin (1788–1873) (son of Pyotr Lopukhin), was granted in 1873 the right to pass his title and name to his great-nephew, general Nikolai Petrovitch Demidoff (1836–1910) styled as the 1st Prince Lopukhin-Demidov, a representative of another branch of this industrialist clan. His son, colonel Aleksander Nikolayevich Demidoff, 2nd Prince Lopukhin-Demidov (1870–1937), moved to Finland after the revolution, bought Anttolanhovi manor in Anttola near Mikkeli in 1917 where he lived for a while, until the inheritance was spent. His spouse was princess Natalia Dmitrievna Naryshkin (1886-1957), who deceased in Mikkeli in 1957. 

Their son was Nikolai Alexandrovich Demidov, 3rd Prince Lopukhin-Demidov (1904–1995), who lived in New Hampshire in the United States. His brother was Aleksander Aleksandrovich Demidoff (1905–1982) who was born and lived in Finland. His son was Yrjö Onni Johannes Demidov, 4th Prince Lopukhin-Demidov (1936–2018). His son is Nikolai Alexander Paul Demidov, 5th Prince Lopukhin-Demidov (1976–). [No reference added, since a page prepared from notes supplied by Alexandre Tissot Demidoff, great-grandson of Princess Aurore on a Angelfire page https://www.angelfire.com/realm/gotha/gotha/demidov.html, is not permitted.]

Hereditary commanders of the Knights Hospitaller

In 1798, Nikolay Nikitich Demidov was made a Family Commander of the Russian Grand Priory of the Order of Saint John, by Tsar Paul I. Those favoured by Emperor Paul and his son Alexander had been given beneficed Commanderies, and others were encouraged to use their wealth to create their own Commanderies; it is these which were known as Family or Ancestral Commanderies.

In 1811, a Ukase was enacted which brought this institution to an end. However, by personal grant of the Emperor, the title of "Hereditary Commander" was held by some descendants who qualified.

In 1928, a group of descendants of the original Family Commanders formed an Association. By 1958, the group was chaired by Grand Duke Vladimir (successor to the Russian Throne). This group regulated the claims of the descendants. On 14 April 1958, under his signature of Grand Duke Vladimir decided in favour of Paul Demidoff; "de faire droit à Votre requête et de confirmer Votre titre de Commandeur Héréditaire de l'Union des Descendants des Commandeurs Héréditaires et Chevaliers du Grand Prieuré Russe de l'Ordre de St. Jean de Jérusalem en tant que descendant direct de Demidoff Nicolas fils de Nicétas qui, par grâce de Mon trisaïeul, S.M. l'Empereur Paul I-r Grand Maître de l'Ordre de St. Jean de Jérusalem avait été élevé le 2I Juillet 1799" - in translation; "to grant Your request and to confirm Your title of Hereditary Commander of the Union of the Descendants of the Hereditary Commanders and Knights of the Russian Grand Priory about St John of Jerusalem as a direct descendant of Demidoff Nicholas son of Nicétas which, by grace of My great-great-grandfather, H.M. the Emperor Paul I Grand Master of the Order of St John of Jerusalem had been elevated 21 July 1799".

Alexandre Tissot Demidoff (of Berkshire, England) chairs an Association which seeks to continue the humanitarian tradition of the Russian Grand Priory, to which Alexander Demidoff (of Paris, and son of Paul Demidoff above) belongs.

Publications
 Anatole Demidoff, Travels in Southern Russia, and the Crimea; through Hungary, Wallachia, & Modavia, during the Year 1837, London, J. Mitchell, 1853,

See also

 Alla Demidova
 Aurora Demidov
 Demidov collection
 Demidov Square
 Demidovsky Pillar, Barnaul
 Demidovsky Pillar, Yaroslavl
 Pavel Grigoryevich Demidov
 Pavel Nikolaievich Demidov
 Pavel Pavlovitch Demidov
 Princedom of San Donato
 Prokofi Demidov
 Villa San Donato

References

External links

History and portraits of the Demidovs
History of the Demidov Family (from the website of Demidov University)

 
Russian noble families